Turing's Wager is a philosophical argument that claims it is impossible to infer or deduce a detailed mathematical model of the human brain within a reasonable timescale, and thus impossible in any practical sense. The argument was first given in 1950 by the computational theorist Alan Turing in his paper Computing Machinery and Intelligence, published in Mind . The argument asserts that determining any mathematical model of a computer (its source code or any isomorphic equivalent such as a Turing machine or virtual simulation) is not possible in a reasonable timeframe. As a consequence, determining a mathematical model of the human brain (which is, by its nature, more complicated) must also be impossible within that timeframe.

Effect of modern technology on wager 

It has been argued that modern neuroimaging techniques will allow researchers to create accurate simulations of the human mind within the 21st century, thereby overcoming the wager. Others have argued that such claims are unjustified .

Relationship between Turing's Wager and the Turing Test 

The Turing Test attempts to define when a machine might be said to possess human intelligence, while Turing's Wager is an argument aiming to demonstrate that characterising the brain mathematically will take over a thousand years. While building an artificial intelligence and mapping the human brain are both difficult endeavours, the former is actually a sub-problem of the latter .

Footnotes

References 

Alan Turing
History of artificial intelligence
History of neuroscience
Neurophilosophy
Philosophy of mind